The Airbus A319 is a member of the Airbus A320 family of short- to medium-range, narrow-body, commercial passenger twin-engine jet airliners manufactured by Airbus. Final assembly of the aircraft takes place in Hamburg, Germany and Tianjin, China.

The A319 is a shortened-fuselage variant of the Airbus A320 and entered service in April 1996 with Swissair, around two years after the stretched Airbus A321 and eight years after the original A320. The aircraft shares a common type rating with all other Airbus A320 family variants, allowing existing A320 family pilots to fly the aircraft without the need for further training.

In December 2010, Airbus announced a new generation of the A320 family, the A320neo (new engine option). The similarly shortened fuselage A319neo variant offers new, more efficient engines, combined with airframe improvements and the addition of winglets, named "sharklets" by Airbus. The aircraft promises fuel savings of up to 15%. The A319neo sales are much lower than other A320neo variants, with around 1% of orders by June 2020.

, a total of 1,488 Airbus A319 aircraft have been delivered, of which 1,380 are in service. In addition, another 68 airliners are on firm order (comprising 2 A319ceo and 66 A319neo). American Airlines is the largest operator with 133 A319ceo in its fleet.

Development

Background

The first member of the A320 family was the A320 which was launched in March 1984 and first flew on 22 February 1987. The family was extended to include the stretched A321 (first delivered 1994), the shortened A319 (1996), and the further shortened A318 (2003). The A320 family pioneered the use of digital fly-by-wire flight control systems, as well as side stick controls, in commercial aircraft. The A319 was developed at the request of Steven Udvar-Hazy, the former president and CEO of ILFC according to The New York Times.

Origins and design

The A319 design is a shortened fuselage, minimum change derivative of the A320 with its origins in the 130- to 140-seat SA1, part of the Single-Aisle studies. The SA1 was shelved as the consortium concentrated on its bigger siblings. After healthy sales of the A320/A321, Airbus re-focused on what was then known as the A320M-7, meaning A320 minus seven fuselage frames. It would provide direct competition for the 737-300/-700. Consequently, the number of overwing exits was reduced from four to two. High-density A319s, such as 156-seat aircraft used by easyJet, retain four overwing exits. The bulk-cargo door was replaced by an aft container door, which can take in reduced height LD3-45 containers. Minor software changes were made to accommodate the different handling characteristics; otherwise the aircraft is largely unchanged.

The A319's wingspan is wider than the aircraft's overall length.

Production and testing

Airbus began offering the new model from 22 May 1992, and the A319's first customer was ILFC, who signed for six aircraft. Anticipating further orders by Swissair and Alitalia, Airbus launched the $275 million (€250 million) programme on 10 June 1993. On 23 March 1995, the first A319 underwent final assembly at Airbus's German plant in Hamburg, where the A321s are also assembled. It was rolled out on 24 August 1995, with the maiden flight the following day. The certification programme took 350 airborne hours involving two aircraft; certification for the CFM56-5B6/2-equipped variant was granted in April 1996, and the qualification for the V2524-A5 started the following month.

Delivery of the first A319, to Swissair, took place on 25 April 1996, entering service by month's end. In January 1997, an A319 broke a record during a delivery flight by flying  on the great circle route to Winnipeg, Manitoba from Hamburg, in 9 hours 5 minutes. The A319 has proved popular with low-cost airlines such as EasyJet, with 172 delivered.

A total of 1,476 of the A319ceo model have been delivered, with 10 remaining on order as of 31 January 2018. The direct Boeing competitor is the Boeing 737-700.

Variants

A319CJ 

The A319CJ (rebranded ACJ319 "Elegance") is the corporate jet version of the A319. Upon resale, the aircraft can be reconfigured as a standard A319 by removing its extra tanks and corporate cabin outfit, thus maximising its resale value. It was formerly also known as the ACJ, or Airbus Corporate Jet, while starting with 2014 it has the marketing designation ACJ319.

The aircraft seats up to 39 passengers, but may be outfitted by the customers into any configuration. Tyrolean Jet Service Nfg. GmbH & CO KG, MJET and Reliance Industries are among its users. The A319CJ competes with other ultralarge-cabin corporate jets such as the Boeing 737-700-based Boeing Business Jet (BBJ) and Embraer Lineage 1000, as well as with large-cabin and ultralong-range Gulfstream G650, Gulfstream G550 and Bombardier's Global 6000. It is powered by the same engine types as the A320. The A319CJ was used by the Escadron de Transport, d'Entraînement et de Calibration which is in charge of transportation for France's officials and also by the Flugbereitschaft of the German Air Force for transportation of Germany's officials. An ACJ serves as a presidential or official aircraft of Albania, Armenia, Azerbaijan, Brazil, Bulgaria, Czech Republic, Germany, Italy, Malaysia, Slovakia, Thailand, Turkey, Ukraine, and Venezuela.

Starting from 2014, a modularized cabin version of the ACJ319, known as "Elegance", is also available. It is said to be able to lower cost and ease reconfiguration.

A319neo 

The A319neo will be part of the Airbus A320neo family of airliners developed since December 2010 by Airbus, with the suffix "neo" meaning "new engine option". It is the last step of the A320 Enhanced (A320E) modernisation programme, which was started in 2006. The A319neo replaces the original A319, which is now referred to as A319ceo, for "current engine option".

In addition to the new engines, the modernisation programme also included such improvements as: aerodynamic refinements, large curved winglets (sharklets), weight savings, a new aircraft cabin with larger hand luggage spaces, and an improved air purification system. Customers will have a choice of either the CFM International LEAP-1A or the Pratt & Whitney PW1100G engines.

The A319neo is the least popular variant of the Airbus A320neo family, with total orders for only 55 aircraft placed as of 31 January 2019, compared with 4,179 for the A320neo and 2,292 for the A321neo.

A319 MPA

The Airbus A319 MPA (Maritime Patrol Aircraft) is a military derivative of the Airbus A319. Development was announced in 2018 by Airbus Defence and Space to compete against the Boeing P-8 Poseidon, which is a derivative aircraft of the Boeing 737 manufactured in the United States.

A319LR

The A319LR is the longer-range version of the A319. The typical range of the A319LR is increased up to 4,500 nautical miles (8,300 km) compared to the standard A319. Qatar Airways was the launch customer, receiving two A319-100LRs, PrivatAir received two A319LRs in 2003, and Eurofly acquired two in 2005.

Operators

As of July 2019, 1,246 Airbus A319 aircraft were in service with 108 operators, with American Airlines and EasyJet operating the largest A319 fleets of 130 and 125 aircraft respectively. The A319 is the most popular variant of the Airbus A320 family to be operated by governments and as executive and private jets, with 75 aircraft in operation in these capacities as of 2019.

Orders and deliveries

Data .

Accidents and incidents 

As of May 2022, there have been 23 aviation accidents and incidents involving the Airbus A319, including five hull-loss accidents. No fatal accidents have been recorded involving the aircraft type.

Specifications

Engines

See also

Notes

References

Sources

External links 

 

A319
1990s international airliners
Twinjets